Shu-Ninua or ŠÚ- or Kidin-Ninua, inscribed mŠÚ-URU.AB x ḪA, the 54th king to appear on the Assyrian Kinglist, was the ruler of Assyria,  1615 to 1602 BC, and was the son of his predecessor-but-one, succeeding Lullaya, a “son of nobody.”

Biography

The reading of the first element in his name is uncertain, as Ignace Gelb and Benno Landsberger originally proposed BAR, giving Kidin-Ninua, "[Under] the protection of Nineveh," while Arno Poebel read the name as beginning with [Š]Ú- and Weidner read it as [Š]I- on another fragmentary copy of the kinglist. J. A. Brinkman observed that with the exception of this disputed interpretation, all transliterations gave ŠÚ, reinforced by the Synchronistic Kinglist, ˹mŠÚ-ni˺-nu-a, which had led to the preponderance for interpreting his name as Shu-Ninua in recent years, “he of Ishtar,” if Nina is correctly identified as a Babylonian name for this deity, although this remains unproven. A recleaning of the fragmentary kinglist, however, has revealed a name collated by Heeßel to be [mki-d]in-dNINUA.

There are no contemporary inscriptions of his reign.  He is recorded as having been a contemporary of Akurduana of the Sealand Dynasty in southern Babylonia in the Synchronistic Kinglist, rather than any supposed ruler from the Kassite dynasty. The Assyrian Kinglist records that he reigned for fourteen years before being succeeded by his sons, Sharma-Adad II and then Erishum III.

Inscriptions

References

17th-century BC Assyrian kings